North Carolina's 77th House district is one of 120 districts in the North Carolina House of Representatives. It has been represented by Republican Julia Craven Howard since 2019.

Geography
Since 2023, the district has included all of Yadkin and Davie counties, as well as part of Rowan County. The district overlaps with the 30th and 33rd, and 36th Senate districts.

District officeholders

Election results

2022

2020

2018

2016

2014

2012

2010

2008

2006

2004

2002

2000

References

North Carolina House districts
Yadkin County, North Carolina
Davie County, North Carolina
Rowan County, North Carolina